Ray Evans (10 September 1939 – 17 June 2014) was an Australian businessperson, political conservative, and campaigner against climate change mitigation efforts.

Biography

Early years and education
Ray Evans was educated at Melbourne High School. He attended the University of Melbourne, from which he graduated in Electrical and Mechanical Engineering. During university, he served as president of the Melbourne University ALP Club, and as a delegate from the Federated Fodder and Fuel Trades Union to Victorian ALP State Conferences.

He resigned from the ALP to act as campaign manager for Sam Benson in the latter's successful campaign to retain the federal seat of Batman as an independent in 1966. In the 1960s, Evans worked as an engineer in the production planning section of the State Electricity Commission of Victoria.

Career
He taught electrical engineering at Deakin University, Victoria. From 1982 until 2001, he was executive officer at Western Mining Corporation (WMC Ltd) in Australia, under Hugh Morgan. From July 2001 to June 2014, he was the director of Ray Evans & Associates, a consultancy specialising in political and economic advice.

Political advocacy
In January 1986, Evans, along with former federal Treasurer Peter Costello and two others, founded the H R Nicholls Society, a think tank of the New Right, of which he became president. The Society has had considerable influence over Liberal Party policies. The initial motivation for founding the Society was industrial relations – a commitment to "freedom in the labour market", and opposition to the Australian industrial relations mechanism, represented by the establishment of the minimum wage by Justice Henry Bourne Higgins in the 1905 "Harvester Judgement".

Global warming skepticism

Evans was a founder of the Lavoisier Group, which opposed the ratification of the Kyoto Protocol treaty, believing that the science associated with global warming is uncertain. He was instrumental in establishing a number of other right-wing organisations, such as the Bennelong Society, and the Samuel Griffith Society, serving as either president or treasurer of each; according to author Clive Hamilton, many of these groups "shared the same post office box". A supporter of the "Greenhouse Mafia", he campaigned against climate change initiatives.

In collaboration with Hugh Morgan, Evans worked against the Kyoto treaty, and was central to the campaign to prevent the former Federal Liberal Government from taking actions to cut emissions.

In February 2006, Evans published Nine Lies About Global Warming, wherein he quotes a 1992 work by political scientist Aaron Wildavsky, which states, "Global warming is the mother of environmental scares."

He appeared on the ABC's discussion panel, The Great Global Warming Swindle, which questioned the science behind global warming. He has stated that environmentalism is a "religious belief," and published a book Nine Facts About Climate Change in 2007.

Evans was quoted in The Age as saying that Al Gore's film An Inconvenient Truth is "bullshit from beginning to end", and that "the carbon-dioxide link [to global warming] is increasingly recognised as irrelevant".

Death and legacy
He died on 17 June 2014 in Melbourne, aged 74 (though some reports incorrectly stated he was 79). The Age then memorialized him as a modern radical:

References

1939 births
2014 deaths
People educated at Melbourne High School
University of Melbourne alumni
Australian activists
Australian businesspeople
Academic staff of Deakin University